Gefilte fish (from , lit. "stuffed fish") is a dish made from a poached mixture of ground deboned fish, such as carp, whitefish, or pike. It is traditionally served as an appetizer by Ashkenazi Jewish households. Popular on Shabbat and Jewish holidays such as Passover, it may be consumed throughout the year. It is typically garnished with a slice of cooked carrot on top.

Historically, gefilte fish was a stuffed whole fish consisting of minced-fish forcemeat stuffed inside the intact fish skin. By the 16th century, cooks had started omitting the labor-intensive stuffing step, and the seasoned fish was most commonly formed into patties similar to quenelles or fish balls.

In an article "Gefilte Fish in America", Tamara Mann Tweel writes: "Born in Europe out of religious obligation, poverty, and ingenuity, gefilte fish survived in America due to bottling technology, innovative advertising, and an American Jewish desire to experience faith through the large intestine."

Origins
Gefilte fish likely originated in non-Jewish, German cooking. The earliest historical reference to gefuelten hechden (stuffed pike) comes from Daz Buoch von Guoter Spise (The Book of Good Food), a German cookbook dating to circa 1350 C.E. Gefuelten hechden was poached and mashed pike that was flavored with herbs and seeds, stuffed back inside the fish skin, and then roasted. This dish was popular with German Catholics during Lent, when it is forbidden to eat meat. By the Middle Ages, stuffed fish had migrated into the cuisine of German and Eastern European Jews.

Preparation and serving

Gefilte fish was traditionally cooked inside the intact skin of a fish, forming a loaf which is then sliced into portions before serving. More commonly, it is now most often cooked and served as oval patties, like quenelles. In the United Kingdom, gefilte fish is commonly fried. Gefilte fish is typically garnished with a slice of carrot on top, and a horseradish mixture called chrain on the side.

To make the modernized "gefilte fish" fish balls, fish fillets are ground and mixed with eggs (some recipes exclude eggs), breadcrumbs  or matza crumbs, spices, salt, onions, carrots, and sometimes potatoes, to produce a paste or dough which is then simmered in fish stock.

Carp, pike, mullet, or whitefish are commonly used to make gefilte fish; more recently, Nile perch and salmon are also used, with gefilte fish made from salmon having a slightly pink hue. Catfish is not used, however, because it is not kosher.

Sweet vs savoury 
Gefilte fish may be slightly sweet or savory. Preparation of gefilte fish with sugar or black pepper is considered an indicator of whether a Jewish community was Galitzianer (with sugar) or Litvak (with pepper); the boundary separating northern from southern East Yiddish has thus been dubbed "the Gefilte Fish Line". That this linguistic divide followed a line of sweet versus savoury gefilte fish preferences was first plotted by Yiddish linguist Marvin Herzog in the mid-1960s.
If you trace this sweet-savory divide, you begin to see more than just a difference in palates. In the mid-1960s, Yiddish language scholar Marvin Herzog was perhaps the first to observe that plotting the boundaries of two of the main Yiddish dialects—the central Polish/Galician (Poylish/Galitzianer), and the more northern Lithuanian (Litvak)—creates a map that lines up exactly with the sweet and savory culinary lines. It's a division that doesn't map to any other political or natural border—a strictly Jewish geography later dubbed "the gefilte fish line." Tell us how you eat your gefilte fish, and we'll tell you who you are. [Italics in original.]
The nineteenth century trend of sweeter gefilte fish to the west of the divide has its roots in the rise of the sugar beet industry in Poland.
"Other Jews had savory noodle kugels," notes [Gil] Marks. "You didn't have sweet challah. The idea of putting sugar into anything else was absurd." But Polish Jews began to put sugar into all of these dishes. Previously peppery kugels. The now-sweet-and-sour stuffed cabbage. And gefilte fish.

Ready-to-serve

The late 1930s brought a brand named Mother's from "Sidney Leibner, the son of a fish store owner." This ready-to-serve fish was followed by "Manischewitz, Mrs. Adler’s, Rokeach and others."

The post-WWII method of making gefilte fish commercially takes the form of patties or balls, or utilizes a wax paper casing around a "log" of ground fish, which is then poached or baked. This product is sold in cans and glass jars, and packed in jelly made from fish broth, or the fish broth itself. The sodium content is relatively high at 220–290 mg/serving. Low-salt, low-carbohydrate, low-cholesterol, and sugar-free varieties are available. The patent for this jelly, which allowed mass-market distribution of gefilte fish, was granted on October 29, 1963, to Monroe Nash and Erich G. Freudenstein. 

Gefilte fish has been described as "an acquired taste," and twentieth century color-coded labels on jars of gefilte fish reflected this divide.

Grocery stores also sell frozen "logs" of gefilte fish.

Religious customs and considerations

Jewish
Among religiously observant Jews, gefilte fish has become a traditional Shabbat food to avoid borer, which is one of the 39 activities prohibited on Shabbat outlined in the Shulchan Aruch. Borer, literally "selection/choosing", would occur when one picks the bones out of the fish, taking "the chaff from within the food".

A less common belief is that fish are not subject to ayin hara ("evil eye") because they are submerged while alive, so that a dish prepared from several fish varieties brings good luck. Moreover, because submersion in the water protects the fish from the evil eye, in the Middle East, fish "became popular for amulets and miscellaneous good luck charms. In Eastern Europe, it even became a name, Fishel, an optimistic reflection that the boy would be lucky and protected."

Gefilte fish is often eaten on sabbath. However, on sabbath, separating bones from meat, as well as cooking, are forbidden by the Talmud. So usually, the dish is prepared the day before and served cold or at room temperature. With gefilte fish being a sabbath dinner staple, and the commandment in Genesis for fish to be "fruitful and multiply, and fill the waters in the seas", fish at sabbath meals took on the patina of aphrodisiac, the sages believing that "the intoxicating [fish] odor on the Sabbath table would encourage couples to 'be fruitful and multiply'—which in Jewish tradition is encouraged on Friday night." Moreover, dag, the Hebrew word for fish, has the numerical value of seven, the day of the sabbath, further underscoring the serving of fish on that day. However, since Jewish law forbids the separating of the flesh of fish from its bones, pre-made fish cakes such as gefilte fish obviate the need to perform such separation, thus making a preparation such as gefilte fish a regular sabbath staple, and the perfect vehicle for the requisite fish aphrodisiac.

Catholic
In Polish Catholic homes, (more commonly in the northern regions near the Baltic Sea), gefilte fish is a traditional dish to be eaten on Christmas Eve (for twelve-dish supper) and  Holy Saturday, as these are traditionally meatless feasts. This follows a pattern in which a number of Jewish non-meat dishes were also eaten on Catholic religious days in Poland.

See also 

 Fishcake
 Polish cuisine
 Israeli cuisine
 Jewish cuisine
 Kamaboko
 Vorschmack

References

External links 
  In print, see 
 
 Claudia Roden: "Gefilte Fish and the Jews". Jewish Heritage Online Magazine
 Haym Soloveitchik: "Rupture and Reconstruction. The Transformation of Contemporary Orthodoxy" (PDF and HTML). In: Tradition, Vol. 28, No. 4 (Summer 1994).

Ashkenazi Jewish cuisine
Carp
Christmas food
Esox
German cuisine
Jewish culture
Jews and Judaism in Europe
Polish cuisine
Salmonidae
Shabbat food
Yiddish words and phrases
Stuffed dishes